4 Gouden Hits is the fifteenth single by the Dutch girl group Luv', released in 1989 by Philips Records. This Maxi CD single includes four hit songs that were successful in 1978 and 1979: "You're the Greatest Lover", "Trojan Horse", "Casanova" and "U.O.Me (You Owe Me)".

Background

In 1989, Luv' made a comeback in 1989 with Marga Scheide (as the only original member) and two new vocalists (Diana van Berlo and Michelle Gold who replaced respectively José Hoebee and Patty Brard). The renewed trio signed a record deal with the Dutch label Dureco and released the Dance-pop single entitled Welcome To My Party (taken from the For You mini-album). Luv' were aiming to match their big Continental European success ten years earlier. However, "Welcome to My Party" only reached the Top 30 in the Netherlands and in Flanders (Belgium).

Meanwhile, Philips Records (in charge of Luv's back catalogue from the late 1970s) decided as a counterattack to reissue material from the group's heyday.

Track listing and release

Maxi CD Single 

You're the Greatest Lover	- 2:52
Trojan Horse - 3:26
Casanova" - 3:50
U.O.Me (You Owe Me) - 2:58

References

1989 singles
Luv' songs
Songs written by Hans van Hemert
Songs written by Piet Souer
1989 songs
Philips Records singles